During the 2000–01 English football season, Kidderminster Harriers F.C. competed in the Football League Third Division.

Season summary
In their first ever season in the Football League, Kidderminster Harriers finished 16th, eight points clear of relegation.

Results

Football League Third Division

FA Cup

League Cup

Football League Trophy

First-team squad
Squad at end of season

Left club during season

References

Kidderminster Harriers F.C. seasons
Kidderminster Harriers